Epifanio de los Santos y Cristóbal, sometimes known as Don Pañong or Don Panyong (April 7, 1871 – April 18, 1928), was a noted Filipino historian, journalist, and civil servant. He was regarded as one of the best Filipino writers and a literary genius. He also entered politics, serving as a member of the Malolos Congress from 1898 to 1899 from Nueva Ecija and later as governor of Nueva Ecija from 1902 to 1906. As a lawyer, he was named as the district attorney of San Isidro, Nueva Ecija in 1900 and later as fiscal of the provinces of Bulacan and Bataan. He was named as an assistant technical director of the Philippine Census in 1918. He was appointed Director of the Philippine Library and Museum by Governor General Leonard Wood in 1925, serving until his death in 1928.

Early life and marriage
Epifanio de los Santos was born in April 7, 1871, in Potrero, Malabon, Province of Manila to Escolastico de los Santos of Nueva Ecija and musician Antonina Cristóbal y Tongco. He studied at the Ateneo Municipal de Manila where he obtained a summa cum laude of Bachelor of Arts degree. He devoted some time for painting but music became part of his daily life and was even awarded a professorship in music. He finished his law studies at University of Santo Tomas and topped the bar exams in 1898. Rafael Palma (1930) noticed that during his college years, his collecting instinct was early manifested when he curiously dedicated himself to gathering plants and flowers in the Nueva Ecija wherein he also sought the company and even communed with the rural communities. According to Agoncillo, "nobody suspected that he would someday become a literary man". As a young law student, his fascination with the study of Spanish literature was through readings of Juan Valera's novel entitled "Pepita Jimenez" and most of all his available works. Eventually, he formed a delightful and lasting friendship with this author which he met in Spain. His home in Intramuros became the meeting place of literary cliques composed of Cecilio Apóstol (Catulo), Fernando María Guerrero (Fulvio Gil), José Palma, Rafael Palma, Jaime C. de Veyra, Macario Pineda, Mariano V. del Rosario, Salvador V. del Rosario, Ysidro Paredes, Macario Adriatico, Jose Clemente Zulueta and Jose G. Abreu. He made a beautiful oil portrait of Rosa Sevilla and composed a melody dedicated to her.

Epifanio's first wife was Doña Ursula Paez of Malabon; his second was Margarita Torralba of Malolos. Jose, his son to his first wife, became a historian, biographer, and collector. His brother, Escolastico, became a pianist for silent films and has made artistic contributions as a poet and a realist story teller in Philippine magazines and newspapers. Socrates, his son from second wife, became a leading Pentagon aeronautics engineer in his time.

He has two lines of descendants with four children on his first wife Ursula Paez namely Jose, Rosario, Escolastico and Antonio and eight children on his second wife Margarita Torralba namely Leticia, Fernando, Socrates, Federico, Hipatia Patria, Espacia Lydia, Glicera Ruth & Margarita.

Literary and scholarly works
Epifanio was considered one of the best Filipino writers in Spanish of his time and regarded as a literary genius. When he was young, he was the first Filipino to become a member of the Spanish Royal Academy of Language, Spanish Royal Academy of Literature and Spanish Royal Academy of History in Madrid. It was the admiration of his writings that Marcelino Menéndez y Pelayo asked the Real Academia Española to open its door to the benevolent young native scholar.

Epifanio was a young associate editor of the revolutionary paper "La Independencia" (1898), writing in prose under the pen name G. Solon and also a member of the Malolos Congress. He also co-founded other newspapers like La Libertad, El Renaciemento, La Democracia, La Patria and Malaysia. He also made valuable publications namely; Algo de Prosa (1909), Literatura Tagala (1911), El Teatro Tagala (1911) Nuestra Literatura (1913), El Proceso del Dr. José Rizal (1914), Folklore Musical de Filipinas (1920). He also authored Filipinos y filipinistas (Filipinos and Filipinists), Filipinas para los Filipinos, Cuentos y paisajes Filipinos (Philippine Stories and Scenes) and Criminality in the Philippines (1903–1908).

He was a member of Samahan ng mga Mananagalog which was initiated by Felipe Calderon in 1904, and it includes active members with the likes of Lope K. Santos, Rosa Sevilla, Hermenegildo Cruz, Jaime C. de Veyra and Patricio Mariano. He was a polyglot, being fluent in Spanish, English, French, German, Ita, Tingian, and Ibalao. He notably translated Florante and Laura classically into sonorous Castilian. As one of the brilliant writers in the Golden Age of Fil-Hispanic literature who had published numerous titles and books, he was an honorary member of the Academia Filipina de la Lengua Española.

As a versatile researcher, he also contributed to early Philippine studies on anthropology, ethnology, archaeology, linguistics and demographics.

Collections
Epifanio de los Santos traveled to many places in Europe, Asia, and Americas searching for rare Philippine documents in museums, archives, and libraries. He collected almost 200 paintings and sculpted pieces done by Juan Luna, Felix Resurreccion Hidalgo, Fabián de la Rosa, Juan Arellano, Pablo Amorsolo, Fernando Amorsolo, Graciano Nepomuceno and Guillermo Tolentino, musical literatures, opera records, valuable printed materials, documents and manuscripts on the revolution and historical pictures. According to Zaide, his famous Filipiniana collection was rated by foreign scholars as the best in the world. In Europe, he was recognized as the philologist and writer of biographical matters about the Philippines.

According to Zaide, there are documents and printed matter in his collection that cannot be found elsewhere, not even in the Filipiniana Division of The National Library nor in any library the world over, the Library of Congress of the United States included.  The best years of his life were spent in looking for them only to find them after an almost "wild goose chase" of a lifetime. His Rizaliana collections were greatly acknowledged by W. E. Retana, James A. Le-Roy, and Austin Craig.

In all, there are 115 printed matter and 213 documents in the collection dealing with Philippine revolution

After de los Santos's death, the Philippine legislature, by virtue of the Philippine Clarin Act, negotiated with the widow and heirs of the great collector for the purchase of the collection and library.  The Philippine government bought the priceless collections for P 19,250.00.

Other interests
Aside from his scholarly works on different facets of the Philippines, he was also known to be one of the best guitarists at that time. According to Teodoro Agoncillo, there were at least two guitarists that could contend with him, and these were Fernando Canon and General Antonio Luna. For him, music is the embodiment of happiness of the soul, the one that could refreshen the withered spirit.

There was even a story that de los Santos and his friend, Clemente Jose Zulueta had a bitter face-off in the office of La Independencia and Antonio Luna offered to pacify the two gentlemen and he offer his guitar to the one who would win the argumentation, and de los Santos won so he received Luna's guitar.

Public service

Epifanio de los Santos was elected the Malolos Congress in September 1898, serving as one of the three representatives from Nueva Ecija until November 1899. In 1900, he was appointed district attorney of the town of San Isidro, Nueva Ecija. He was later elected as governor of Nueva Ecija in 1902 and again in 1904, serving until 1906. His election victory made him the first democratically elected provincial governor and head of the Federal Party in Nueva Ecija. A member of the Philippine Commission, he was immediately considered as one of those Filipino intellectuals to represent the Saint Louis World's Fair in 1904. He was later appointed provincial fiscal of Bulacan and Bataan provinces. He wrote a treatise on electoral fraud "Electoral Fraud and its Remedies" (Fraudes Electorales y Sus Remedios) in 1907 for the Philippine Assembly. On the side, he devoted his spare time to researches in Philippine history and literature. Portions of his collections where destroyed when fires hit his house in San Isidro, Nueva Ecija. According to Agoncillo and Palma, his interest lies not in politics. In 1918, he was appointed by Governor General Francis Burton Harrison as Assistant Technical Director of the Philippine Census.

The last and most significant position de los Santos held was Director of the Philippine Library and Museum, to which he was appointed by Governor General Leonard Wood in 1925. He succeeded his colleague Trinidad Pardo de Tavera, who died on March 26, 1925. He was also elected as third President of the Philippine Library Association (now Philippine Librarians Association, Inc.), becoming the first Filipino of native parentage to assume such position professionally for Philippine library science. As a director of the Philippine Library, he immersed himself in his work and, according to bibliographer Gabriel Bernardo, gave up “all his other avocations except music and bibliophily.”

Death and legacy

He died in office on April 18, 1928, 11 days after his 57th birthday. The Philippine government paid him the tribute of a state funeral. Local and foreign scholars lamented the loss of one who they described as a "Great among the Great Filipino Scholars."

Epifanio de los Santos Avenue (commonly known as EDSA), the main road through Metro Manila, was named after him. Several schools, streets, a college, a hospital, a printing press and an auditorium in National Library of the Philippines were also named in his honor.

References

Bibliography

 CCP Encyclopedia of Philippine Art. Vol IX. Philippine Literature. Manila: Cultural Center of the Philippines, 1994
 Agoncillo, Teodoro A. 2002 ed. The revolt of the masses- the story of Bonifacio and the Katipunan. University of the Philippines Press. E. de los Santos St., UP Campus, Diliman, Quezon City.
 Epifanio de los Santos (Great among the great Filipino scholars). 1982. Printed by Merriam School & Office. Supplies Corporation, Manila.
 The Delos Santos family descendants memorabilia, historical pictures and clippings.
 Philippine Free Press. Manila. April 28, 1928.
 The Manila Tribune. April 19, 1928
 National Historical Institute (NHI). 1990. Filipinos in history. Vol. II. Manila.
 Bacallan, Joyce. 1988. Hero of the month- Epifanio delos Santos- a great Filipino academician. The youngster.  p. 7.
 Bernardo, Fernando A.  2000. Silent storms: inspiring lives of 101 great Filipinos. Anvil Publishing, Inc. pp. 37–38. 
 Bantug, Jose P. Epifanio de los Santos Cristobal. pp. 215–223.
 Baylon, Gloria J. EDSA: Country's Avenue of History. The Philippine Post Nation: Leading to the Next Millennium. February 23, 1998.
 Buencamino, Felipe; De los Santos, Epifanio. Census of the Philippine Islands: taken under the direction of Philippine legislature in the year 1918. A Government Publication. Manila: Bureau Printing. (1921?)
 Carson, Taylor; De los Santos, Epifanio. 1927. History of the Philippine Press. Manila. 61 pp.
 Cayco, Librado D. (1934) Epifanio de los Santos Cristobal. Manila. National Heroes Day. University of the Philippines.
 Churchill, Bernadette R.  Epifanio de los Santos, pioneer historian. In History & Culture, Language & Literature: Selected Essays of Teodoro A. Agoncillo. pp. 239–245.
 Cullinane, Michael. 2003. Illustrado politics: Filipino elite responses to American rule, 1989–1908. Ateneo de Manila University.
 De los Santos, Epifanio. 1909. Algo de prosa. Madrid Fortanet. 70 pp.
 De los Santos, Epifanio. 1909. Cinco notas al Capitulo octavo de los "Sucesos de las Islas Filipinas" del Dr. Antonio de Morga (en su nueva edición de W.E. Retana). Madrid Fortanet. 24 pp.
 De los Santos, Epifanio. 1909. Literatura tagala : Conferencia leída en el Liceo de Manila ante el "Samahan ng mananagálog". Madrid Fortanet.25 pp.
 De los Santos, Epifanio. 1911. Informe acerca de una obra sobre los orígenes de la imprenta filipina. Madrid Imprenta de Fortanet. 52 pp.
 De los Santos, Epifanio. 1913. Trinidad H. Pardo de Tavera. Cultura Filipina 4 (1): 1-49.
 De los Santos, Epifanio. 1913. Ignacio Villamor: El funcionario y el hombre. Cultura Filipina 4 (3): 351–359.
 De los Santos, Epifanio. 1915. Ignacio Villamor: El funcionario y el hombre. Cultura Filipina 5 (4): 275–294.
 De los Santos, Epifanio. 1916. Rafael del Pan: The Philippine Review 1 (May): 41–44.
 De los Santos, Epifanio.1957.Marcelo H. del Pilar; Andres Bonifacio; Emilio Jacinto. Kapisanang Pangkasaysayan ng Pilipinas. English and Tagalog. Translated from Spanish.
 De los Santos, Epifanio. 1973. The revolutionists: Aguinaldo, Bonifacio, Jacinto. Translated and edited by Teodoro A. Agoncillo. Manila: National Historical Commission.
 De los Santos, Epifanio. 1909. Epifanía Wenceslao E. Retana, ensayo crítico acerca de este ilustre filipinista. Establecimiento Tipográfico de Fortanet, Madrid.
 Dungo, Dolores T. Epifanio de los Santos. Epifanio de los Santos College, Malabon, Rizal.
 Espino, Licsi F. Jr. 1977. A Historian with style: love of learning chiseled the man. Archipelago: International Magazine of the Philippines 1:37-38. 
 Fermin, Jose D. 2004. 1904 World's Fair: the Filipino experience. E. de los Santos St., UP Campus, Diliman Quezon City. p. 73. 
 Gwekoh, Sol H. Biographical Sketch: Epifanio de los Santos. Variety. p 13.
 Hardtendorp, A. V. H. Don Pañong – genius. Philippine Magazine 26 (Sept.) 210–11, 234–235.
 Hernandez, Vicente S. 1996. History of books and libraries in the Philippines 1521-1900: A study of the sources and chronology of events pertaining to Philippine library history from the sixteenth to the end of the nineteenth century. National Commission for Culture and the Arts, Manila.
 Mella, Cesar. 1974. Directory of Filipino Writers: Past and Present. Manila. CTM enterprises.
 Mojares, Resil B. 2006. Brains of the nation: Pedro Paterno, T.H. Pardo de Tavera, Isabelo de los Reyes and the production of modern knowledge. Ateneo de Manila University Press. Bellarmine Hall, Katipunan Avenue Loyola Heights, Quezon City. p. 477. 
 Nieva, Gregorio, ed. 1880- Manila, P.I.: G. Nieva [etc.]. 2005. The Philippine review (Revista filipina) [Vol. 2, no. 1]. More about Jose Rizal by Epifanio de los Santos. Ann Arbor, Michigan: University of Michigan Library. p. 22.
 Palma, Rafael. 1930. Epifanio de los Santos Cristobal.(English translation by Tiburcio Tumaneng from the Spanish Original). Manila. 14 pp.
 Qurino, Carlos. 1995. Who's who in the Philippine history. Manila. Tahanan Books.
 San Juan, E. Jr. Social Consciousness and Revolt in Modern Philippine Poetry. pp. 394–399.
 Santos, Ramon Pagayon. 2007. Tunugan: four essays on Filipino Music. The University of The Philippines Press. 216 pp.
 Villareal, Hector K. et al. 1965. Eminent Filipinos. Manila: National Historical Commission.
 Zaide, Gregorio F. 1930. Epifanio de los Santos, his collection and library. The Tribune Magazine. pp. 4–5
 Zaide, Gregorio F. 1965. Epifanio de los Santos: Great among the great Filipino scholars. In Great Filipinos in history. 88: 575–581.

External links

 
 
 Who is EDSA?
  at www.geocities.com
 The North American Filipino Star - great composers and the success of the Kundiman  at www.filipinostar.org
 Strangers to Us All - The World's Lawyer Poets at www.myweb.wvnet.edu
 Viva La Independencia! --> at www.pia.gov.ph
 Virtual Law Library: Epifanio de los Santos Avenue
 Epifanio Delos Santos: The historian who became part of history  at https://news.google.com/newspapers
 Roles of Rizal, Bonifacio and other Heroes in the Development of the Republic of the Philippines from articles of Epifanio De Los Santos  at http://www.malaya.com.ph

1871 births
1928 deaths
University of Santo Tomas alumni
Ateneo de Manila University alumni
Filipino Roman Catholics
Filipino artists
Filipino composers
Linguists from the Philippines
20th-century Filipino lawyers
Filipino journalists
People of the Philippine Revolution
Filipino poets
Filipino educators
20th-century Filipino historians
Spanish-language writers of the Philippines
Nonviolence advocates
Members of the Royal Spanish Academy
People from Malabon
People from Nueva Ecija
Burials at the Manila North Cemetery
Filipino male poets
Members of the Malolos Congress
Governors of Nueva Ecija